The Eye-Q Go Wireless Digital Camera was the first Bluetooth-enabled camera to be made and put on the market. It came with a small Bluetooth drive to plug into the back of a computer, which transmits pictures at a very slow rate (Uploading 7MBs of pictures takes 15 minutes, whereas a normal digital camera takes 8 seconds). It also employs a 2-megapixel CMOS sensor, which makes every picture very dark. The flash is also faulty, and when it does work, it is very slow.

External links
 PC World review
 The 25 Worst Tech Products of All Time

Digital cameras